Sartell High School is a public high school in Sartell, Minnesota, United States. The old high school was constructed in 1993 and was remodeled to become the new Sartell Middle School. The new Sartell High School opened to the public fall of 2019.

Demographics
The demographic breakdown of the 1,032 students enrolled for the 2012–2013 school year was:

Male - 52.5%
Female - 47.5%
Asian/Pacific islander - 1.3%
Black - 0.9%
Hispanic - 1.3%
White - 96.4%
Multiracial - 0.1%

In addition, 13.2% of the students were eligible for free or reduced lunch.

Athletics
Sartell's team name is the Sabres and their colors are royal blue and white.  The following sports are offered:

Baseball
Basketball - Boys
Basketball - Girls
Cross Country
Dance Team
Football
Golf - Boys
Golf - Girls
Gymnastics
Hockey - Boys
Hockey - Girls
Knowledge Bowl
Lacrosse - Boys
Lacrosse - Girls
Soccer - Boys
Soccer - Girls
Softball
Swimming & Diving - Boys
Swimming & Diving - Girls
Tennis - Boys
Tennis - Girls
Track and Field - Boys and Girls
Volleyball
Wrestling

Alumni
 Naarah Hastings (class of 1998), politician 
 For All Those Sleeping (class of 2007), metalcore band

References

External links 
School website
School district website

Sartell, Minnesota
Public high schools in Minnesota
Educational institutions established in 1993
Schools in Stearns County, Minnesota
1993 establishments in Minnesota